Planica 1936 was a ski jumping event, considered as the birth of ski flying, held on 15 March 1936 in Planica, Drava Banovina, Yugoslavia. Total of 16,000 people gathered to watch the competition.

Schedule

Competition
Training was scheduled, on 13 March, however warm weather with warm wind caused it to be cancelled. A few jumpers did few training jumps on a smaller hill in Rateče, but encountered problems with the wind.

On 14 March, the only training was scheduled for the afternoon, after the weather finally cleared up. Birger Ruud made the longest jump at 93 metres.

The novel discipline of ski flying is considered to have been started by  Josef Bradl on 15 March. The trial round began at 10:30 AM and continued with two rounds of international competition. After that, the second round was a non-competitive event with a goal of setting new world records. In the last round of the day, Sepp Bradl became the first man in history to  jump over one hundred metres while standing, landing at 101.5 metres.

Results

Official training
15:00 PM — 14 March 1936 — chronological order

Trial round
10:30 AM — 15 March 1936 — Trial jump — chronological order

International competition
11:00 AM — 15 March 1936 — Two rounds — chronological order

Non-competition record hunting event

13:45 PM — 15 March 1936 — Two rounds — chronological order

 World record and first recorded standing jump over 100 m Fall or touch

Official results

International competition

Also applied this year
But non of them haven't jumped at all these days:
Norway — Sigmund Ruud, Gunnar. K. Hagen, Björn Karlson, Kaarby (four chosen boycott)
Austria — Walter Delle Karth Sr., Walter Weissenbacher, Erwin Ludescher
Switzerland — Marcel Raymond, Walter Kuster

Ski flying world record

Boycott by Norway
Four competitors from Norway who were chosen to compete boycotted the event. They objected because the hill was bigger than allowed at the time. They demanded a hill rearrangement to the K80 standard. When negotiation with the organizers failed, they left the event the middle of the trial round and under the leadership of Sigmund Ruud.

Footnotes

References

1936 in Yugoslav sport
1936 in ski jumping
1936 in Slovenia
Ski jumping competitions in Yugoslavia
International sports competitions hosted by Yugoslavia
Ski jumping competitions in Slovenia
International sports competitions hosted by Slovenia